Chennai Super Kings (CSK) is franchise cricket team based in Chennai, Tamil Nadu, India , which plays in the Indian Premier League (IPL). They were one of the eight teams to compete in the 2020 Indian Premier League. The Super Kings have lifted the IPL title thrice (in 2010, 2011 and 2018), and have the best win percentage among all teams in the IPL (61.28). They hold the records of most appearances in the playoffs (ten) and the Final (eight) of the IPL. They were the only IPL team to qualify for the playoff stage until 2019 of their appearance in the league. The team finished the tournament with 6 wins and 8 losses, failing to qualify for the playoffs for the first time.

Background

Player retention

The Chennai Super Kings retained 19 players and released five players. CSK have not traded any player in 2020. On 29 August 2020, Suresh Raina has returned to India due to his personal reasons and will miss whole IPL 2020. On 4 September, Harbhajan Singh pulls out the tournament citing personal reasons.

Retained players: MS Dhoni (c), Suresh Raina, Faf du Plessis, Murali Vijay, Ravindra Jadeja, Mitchell Santner, Lungi Ngidi, Kedar Jadhav, Ambati Rayudu, Narayan Jagadeeshan, Harbhajan Singh, KM Asif, Shardul Thakur, Shane Watson, Imran Tahir, Ruturaj Gaikwad, Deepak Chahar, Monu Kumar, Karn Sharma, Dwayne Bravo.

Released players: Sam Billings, David Willey, Mohit Sharma, Dhruv Shorey and Chaitanya Bishnoi.

Auction
Josh Hazlewood was also sold to their team at his base price of  
Aside from these three, CSK purchased Tamil Nadu spinner, R Sai Kishore.

Players bought: Sam Curran, Piyush Chawla, Ravisrinivasan Sai Kishore, Josh Hazlewood.

Team Analysis
ESPNcricinfo wrote "In the auction 2020, CSK got what they wanted. The team wisely chose Sam Curran and Josh Hazlewood for the Chennai pitch. Although some may say that Piyush Chawla was not included in the team, the franchise may have wanted more experience in the team and there would have been a better balance of Chawla as an alternative to Imran Tahir. Except for the lack of a left-arm fast bowler, the team does not have much problem."

Indian Premier League
On 19 September, the Chennai started their season campaign with a 5-wickets victory over the Mumbai Indians. For Chennai MS Dhoni won the toss & elected to field first. Mumbai scored 162 runs with loss of 9 wickets. Chasing a target of 163, the team had lost two wickets in a first two overs, but Ambati Rayudu (71) and Faf du Plessis (58) brilliant inning and their century partnership (115-run) with Faf du Plessis, helped the Super Kings to beat the defending champions. For Chennai Lungi Ngidi, Deepak Chahar and Ravindra Jadeja took 1-1 wickets.

On 22 September, the Super Kings lost their first match of the season to the Rajasthan Royals by 16 runs. MS Dhoni won the toss and elected to field. Rajasthan cruised past 100, and Sanju Samson posted a 74 off 32 balls before getting out, and Smith also got 69 off 47 balls as Royals posted a daunting 216 at the end of their 20 overs. Jofra Archer 27 in 8 balls and finished strongly for the royals, scoring 30 runs in the last over. Super Kings started off rapidly in their chase, getting 56 runs in the first six overs without losing a wicket. Once again Faf du Plessis got a half-century, and at the end they got to 200/6.

On 25 September, the Super Kings suffered their second successive defeat, to the Delhi Capitals by 44-run. Dhoni won the toss and elected to field. Prithvi Shaw (64 off 43 balls) got the support from Shikhar Dhawan ( 35 off 27 balls) to built a 94-run partnership for first wicket and helped the Delhi finish the inning at 175/3 in their 20 overs. chasing the target of 176, Super Kings got off to a poor start as they lost both their openers quickly, but du plessis ( 43 off 35 balls) and Kedar Jadhav stitched a partnership to keep Super Kings hopes and Super Kings could manage only 131/7 in 20 overs. The team witnessed a roller-coaster ride with just 2 wins and 6 losses.Chennai Super Kings were poorly humiliated against Mumbai Indians by a 10 wicket loss with Trent Boult taking 4 wickets against CSK.CSK next played against Royal Challengers Bangalore and were back in the game with a good performance from Ruturaj Gaikwad who scored a half century to keep CSK alive in the playoff race.However their hopes were broken,when Rajasthan Royals defeated Mumbai Indians,eliminating CSK.However, CSKdefeated Kolkata Knight Riders and played their last game against Kings XI Punjab, the team won by 9 wickets,ending their dismal IPL campaign on a winning note.

Preseason
On 2 March 2020, at the MA Chidambaram Stadium situated in Chepauk facilitated a large number of Chennai Super Kings (CSK) fans as any semblance of MS Dhoni, Suresh Raina among others players kept preparing for the upcoming period of Indian Premier League (IPL).

Offseason
The schedule for the league stage of this season were released on 15 February with the Chennai Super Kings playing their first match against the Mumbai Indians on 29 March 2020, away from home at Mumbai.

On 13 March 2020, the BCCI postponed the tournament until 15 April, in view of the ongoing coronavirus pandemic. On 14 April 2020, Narendra Modi said that the lockdown in India would last until at least 3 May 2020, with the tournament postponed further. The following day, the BCCI suspended the tournament indefinitely due to the pandemic.

On 17 May 2020, the Indian government relaxed nation-wide restrictions on sports events, allowing events to take place behind closed doors. On 24 May, Indian sports minister Kiren Rijiju stated that the decision on whether or not to allow the tournament to be conducted in 2020 will be made by the Indian government based on "the situation of the pandemic". In June 2020, the BCCI confirmed that their preference was to host the tournament in India, possibly between September and October. On 24 July 2020, it was confirmed that the tournament would start from 19 September 2020.

In an interview, Dhoni said on the StarSports show, 

 Squad 
 Players with international caps are listed in bold.

Administration and support staff

Kit manufacturers and sponsors

Teams and standings
 Results by match 

League table

 League stage 

The full schedule of the 2020 season was published on the IPL website.

 Matches 

Statistics
Most runs

 Source:Cricinfo

Most wickets

 Source:'Cricinfo

Awards and achievements

Awards
 Man of the Match

References

Cricket teams in India
2020 Indian Premier League
Chennai Super Kings seasons